Gostomia  is a village in the administrative district of Gmina Biała, within Prudnik County, Opole Voivodeship, in southern Poland.

The village has a population of 392.

Notable people
  (1841–1902), Polish teacher, publicist and activist
  (1872–1939), Polish priest and activist murdered by the SS during World War II
  (1881–1949), Polish Franciscan friar

References

Gostomia